Events from the year 1777 in France

Incumbents
 Monarch – Louis XVI

Events
3 June – Treaty of Aranjuez

Births
31 January – Jean-Pierre Vibert, rosarian (died 1866)
12 February
 Bernard Courtois, chemist (died 1838)
 Friedrich de la Motte Fouqué, poet (died 1843)
3 March – Adolphe Dureau de la Malle, geographer, naturalist, historian and artist (died 1857)
3 December – Juliette Récamier, saloniste (died 1849)
Auguste, comte de La Ferronays, politician (died 1842)

Deaths
 
27 January – Hubert de Brienne, naval commander (born 1690)
20 March – Jean-François-Joseph de Rochechouart, cardinal (born 1708)
7 May
Charles de Brosses, writer (born 1709)
Jean-Baptiste Nicolas Roch de Ramezay, officer of the marines and colonial administrator for New France (born 1708)
23 August – Charles-Joseph Natoire, painter (born 1700)
13 July – Guillaume Coustou the Younger, sculptor (born 1715)
6 October – Marie Thérèse Rodet Geoffrin, saloniste (born 1699)

See also

References

1770s in France